The FreeX Joker is a German single-place, paraglider that was designed and produced by FreeX of Egling in the mid-2000s. It is now out of production.

Design and development
The Joker was designed as a beginner glider. Like all FreeX wings it features internal diagonal bracing. The models are each named for their relative size.

Variants
Joker S
Small-sized model for lighter pilots. The glider model is DHV 1 certified.
Joker M
Mid-sized model for medium-weight pilots. The glider model is DHV 1 certified.
Joker L
Large-sized model for heavier pilots. The glider model is DHV 1 certified.

Specifications (Joker L)

References

Joker
Paragliders